This is a list of the Australian moth species of the family Lyonetiidae. It also acts as an index to the species articles and forms part of the full List of moths of Australia.

Bedelliinae
Bedellia somnulentella (Zeller, 1847)
Bedellia yasumatsui Kuroko, 1972

Cemiostominae
Crobylophora chrysidiella Meyrick, 1880
Crobylophora daricella Meyrick, 1880
Crobylophora psammosticta Turner, 1923
Leucoptera acromelas (Turner, 1923)
Leucoptera arethusa Meyrick, 1915
Leucoptera argodes Turner, 1923
Leucoptera argyroptera Turner, 1923
Leucoptera asbolopasta Turner, 1923
Leucoptera chalcopleura Turner, 1923
Leucoptera chalocycla (Meyrick, 1882)
Leucoptera deltidias Meyrick, 1906
Leucoptera diasticha Turner, 1923
Leucoptera euryphaea Turner, 1926
Leucoptera hemizona Meyrick, 1906
Leucoptera iolitha Turner, 1923
Leucoptera melanolitha Turner, 1923
Leucoptera periphracta Meyrick, 1915
Leucoptera phaeopasta (Turner, 1923)
Leucoptera plagiomitra Turner, 1923
Leucoptera sortita Meyrick, 1915
Leucoptera spartifoliella (Hübner, 1813)
Leucoptera strophidota Turner, 1923
Leucoptera toxeres Turner, 1923
Nematobola candescens Meyrick, 1893

Lyonetiinae
Arctocoma ursinella Meyrick, 1880
Atalopsycha atyphella Meyrick, 1880
Cateristis centrospila (Turner, 1923)
Cateristis triradiata Turner, 1926
Dascia sagittifera Meyrick, 1893
Diplothectis chionochalca Meyrick, 1893
Hierocrobyla lophocera Turner, 1923
Hierocrobyla sporodectis Meyrick, 1915
Leioprora ascepta Turner, 1900
Lyonetia embolotypa Turner, 1923
Lyonetia lechrioscia Turner, 1926
Lyonetia penthesilea Meyrick, 1921
Lyonetia photina Turner, 1923
Lyonetia scriptifera Meyrick, 1921
Stegommata hesperias Meyrick, 1893
Stegommata leptomitella Meyrick, 1880
Stegommata sulfuratella Meyrick, 1880

External links 
Lyonetiidae at Australian Faunal Directory

Australia
Lyonetiidae